Revetment may refer to:

Revetment, a sloping structure used in erosion control (at a riverbank or coastline) or as part of military fortifications
Revetment (aircraft), an area for parking aircraft that is protected by blast walls
Riza, a metal cover protecting a religious icon
A façade of stone slabs or decorated ceramic plaques used as the outer facing layer of a wall, especially in Ancient Roman architecture